Shameless Proposals is a 2019 Pakistani anthology web series, produced by Sadia Jabbar under their banner Sadia Jabbar Production and written by Saji Gul. First episode of the series aired online on 29 March 2019. It became the second web series launched in Pakistan since Wajahat Rauf's Enaaya released earlier that year.

Premise

References

2019 Pakistani television series debuts
2019 web series debuts
Pakistani web series
2019 Pakistani television series endings
Pakistani anthology television series